The Lancia Montecarlo (Type 137) is a Pininfarina-designed mid-engined sports car produced by Lancia in Italy from 1975 to 1981.

Cars from the first series, which were produced from 1975 to 1978, were known as Lancia Beta Montecarlos and those from the second series, produced from 1980 to 1981, simply as Lancia Montecarlos. In both cases Montecarlo was spelled as one word, unlike Monte Carlo in the Principality of Monaco. Both series were offered in Coupé and Spider versions, the latter featuring a unique roll-back manually operated targa style convertible top. A modified version of the Spider was sold in the United States as the Lancia Scorpion during 1976 and 1977.

Total production numbers come to 7,798 units, with production spanning from 1974 until 1982 with an interruption in 1979. 3,558 first series and 817 second series targas were built; 2,080 first series and 1,123 second series coupés. There were also 220 competition models built (Lancia 037).

Design 

Fiat was seeking a replacement for its 124 Coupe so Pininfarina was commissioned to design and develop the replacement. However, Bertone came up with cheaper alternative, which became the Fiat X1/9. Pininfarina continued with its project called Fiat X1/8 that called for a mid-engined sports car with a 3-litre V6 motor. The X1/8 project was to be Pininfarina’s first ever car to be wholly developed and built in house rather than basing on existing production car.
Initial design work was done by 1969, and a final design was completed in 1971 by Paolo Martin.

During the first oil crisis in the 1970s, the project was renamed "X1/20", and the motor was changed to a 2-litre four-cylinder version. The first X1/20 prototype was Fiat Abarth SE 030 for racing in 1974. After the racing season of 1974, Fiat terminated its Abarth SE 030 programme. The X1/20 project was given to Lancia who wanted a premium alternative to Fiat X1/9 and somewhat a halo car.

For a premium level of equipment, Lancia had the new 1,995 cc variant of the twin-cam four-cylinder motor from the Fiat 124 Sport Coupé, MacPherson suspension and again like the 124 Sport Coupé, a five-speed gearbox and disc brakes both front and rear. As the resulting Montecarlo shared very few components with the other Beta models, Pininfarina was chosen to build the car in its entirety.

The Montecarlo was available as a fixed head "Coupé" and as an open-roof "Spider" with a large folding canvas roof between solid A and B pillars.

*stated by Pininfarina production records

Models

First series
The Beta Montecarlo was finally unveiled at the 45th Geneva Salon International de l'Auto in March 1975.
First Series cars (from 1975 to 1978) were badged as Lancia Beta Montecarlo. They were named "Montecarlo", written as one word, not Monte Carlo, one of Monaco's administrative areas.
Power came from a twin cam, 1995 cc Lampredi inline four, developing  at 6000 rpm. Lancia claimed a top speed of over 190 km/h and a 0–100 km/h acceleration time of 9.3 seconds.

Distinctions of the first series were the solid panels to the rear wings above the engine bay and 5.5Jx13" "bow-tie" alloy wheels, unique to this model. The interior was upholstered in vinyl (TVE, Elasticized Vinylic Textile) as standard, in cloth as an option. The driver's side mirror (right one was optional) was a Vitaloni Californian.
In 1978 the production of the Beta Montecarlo was halted.

Lancia Scorpion

The convertible version of the Beta Montecarlo was federalized and marketed in the United States from 1976-1977 as the Lancia Scorpion, to avoid conflicting with the Chevrolet Monte Carlo. 1,805 were manufactured in 1976 and sold as model year 1976 and 1977 (1396 and 405 respectively).

To accommodate U.S. emission regulations, a smaller emissions-tuned 1,756 cc twin cam engine was fitted. With less aggressive camshaft profiles, a smaller carburetor, and the compression ratio reduced to just 8.1:1, the Scorpion delivered , down from the 120 of the Montecarlo.  To meet crash test and lighting requirements, the Scorpion had bigger 5-mph bumpers and low-rise pop-up, sealed beam headlights, adding some 130 lbs to the curb weight. Two additional series of vents on the engine cover were required to cool the catalyst.

Second series

After a two-year hiatus the revised second series was introduced in 1980. The Beta prefix was ditched, and the car was now simply badged as the Lancia Montecarlo.

On the exterior the most evident changes were the updated signature Lancia split grille first introduced with the 1979 Delta, the glazed rear buttresses (providing better visibility) and, in place of the model badging on the tail, a full width brushed aluminium strip. Larger eight-spoke 5,5Jx14" alloy wheels from the Beta were adopted to clear the upsized brake rotors and calipers, and the brake servo was removed to address the brake lockup issue.
In the cabin there was a new three spoke Momo steering wheel in place of the old two spoke one, as well as revamped trim and fabrics.
The engine was revised too: a higher compression ratio, Marelli electronic ignition and new carburettors made for torque gain.

Issues

The Montecarlo/Scorpion suffered from several issues. Between the taller springs used to meet the US height requirements, a lack of caster, and bump steer, handling of US market Scorpions did not meet the promises of the car’s design.

The engine noise in the interior of the car was sometimes criticized; Road & Track listing noise as one of their biggest complaints about the car, with "little joy listening to the wheeze of an emission equipment-stifled 4-banger", and Motor calling the engine noise a "raucous cacophony".

Harsh shifting is common and increases as the bushings wear (a common trait in mid-engined cars). The rear crossmember is a design flaw; the metal used was too thin and is susceptible to corrosion and eventual failure, although stronger replacement crossmembers are available from aftermarket companies.

The S1 Montecarlos and Scorpions suffered from overly boosted brakes, which caused the fronts to lock up easily in the wet. These were often criticised in reviews; for example Road & Track complained of "severe front locking and 37% fade" and Motor that they found "it disconcertingly easy to lock up the front wheels when approaching corners".

As a result, production was suspended in 1978 while the braking problems were resolved by some engineering changes, including removing the brake servo.

Rust is an issue for the Montecarlo and Scorpion.  Unless kept in a dry environment active prevention is required to fend off rust.  The firewall and wheel wells are common locations for rust. Rusted floor pans are a major cause of early Montecarlo/Scorpion demise.

Racing

Abarth SE 030

The first offspring of the X1/20 project to actually be revealed to the public wasn't the definitive Beta Montecarlo, but rather the Abarth 030.
Powered by a 280 hp, 3.2 liter V6, sporting conspicuous aerodynamic appendages (including a snorkel over the roof to feed the engine) and the Abarth red-yellow livery, the SE 030 was first intended as a replacement to the 124 Abarth in motorsport. Nevertheless, Fiat for the time being preferred racing the high volume selling 131 for marketing reasons, and only two Abarth 030s were ever made.

In 1974 one of the two prototypes took part in the then-popular Giro d'Italia automobilistico, a championship consisting of both road and track races. Driven by Giorgio Pianta and Cristine Becker it scored a remarkable second place, just behind the Lancia Stratos Turbo of the duo Andruet-Biche.

Montecarlo Turbo
The Montecarlo Turbo was a Group 5 racer. It was the first racing car to be fielded by Lancia in eight years when it entered the May 1979 Silverstone Six-Hours race. It won the 1979 World Championship for Makes (under 2-litre division) and overall for 1980 World Championship for Makes and 1981 World Endurance Championship for Makes. Hans Heyer also won the Deutsche Rennsport Meisterschaft in 1980 at the wheel of a Montecarlo. In 1980 Turbo also placed first and second at Giro d'Italia automobilistico, an Italian counterpart of the Tour de France Automobile.

Being a silhouette car, the Montecarlo Turbo only shared the centre section of the body with its namesake production car. Front and rear tubular subframes supported the suspension and housed the engine, still mid-mounted with Colotti gearbox. Three engines were used: 440 hp 1,425.9 cc, 490 hp 1,429.4 cc and 490 hp 1,773.0 cc.

Rally 037

The Montecarlo was the basis for Lancia's successful Group B rally car, the Lancia 037. Debuting in 1982, the car won the 1983 WRC Manufacturers' Championship for Lancia.

Similarly to the Montecarlo Turbo, the 037 only retained the centre section from the Montecarlo but little else, and its supercharged engine, while still midship, was mounted longitudinally rather than transversely as it is in the Montecarlo.

In popular culture
 A Lancia Scorpion appeared in Disney's Herbie Goes to Monte Carlo (1977) as Herbie's girlfriend Giselle.

 The car can be seen twice (red and grey model) in Dario Argento's Tenebre (1982).

Gallery

References

External links

 Montecarlo Network
 Montecarlo.Org
 Scorpion Yahoo Group
 Lancia Montecarlo restoration tips

Montecarlo
Rear mid-engine, rear-wheel-drive vehicles
Convertibles
Coupés
1980s cars
Cars introduced in 1975
Cars discontinued in 1981
Pininfarina

it:Lancia Beta#La Montecarlo